The Smittinidae is a family within the bryozoan order Cheilostomatida. Colonies are encrusting on shells and rocks or upright bilaminar branches or sheets. The zooids generally have at least one adventitious avicularia on their frontal wall near the orifice. The frontal wall is usually covered with small pores and numerous larger pores along the margin. The ovicell, which broods the larvae internally, is double-layered with numerous pores in the outer layer, and sits quite prominently on the frontal wall of the next zooid.

Classification 

Family Smittinidae
 Genus Alismittina
 Genus Aspericreta
 Genus Dakariella
 Genus Dengordonia
 Genus Dittomesia
 Genus Hemismittoidea
 Genus Hippophylactella
 Genus Houzeauina
 Genus Parasmittina
 Genus Pemmatoporella
 Genus Phylactella
 Genus Phylactellina
 Genus Plagiosmittia
 Genus Platychelyna
 Genus Pleurocodonellina
 Genus Porismittina
 Genus Prenantia
 Genus Raymondcia
 Genus Rimulostoma
 Genus Schismoporella
 Genus Smittina
 Genus Smittinella
 Genus Smittoidea
 Genus Thrypticocirrus
 Genus Tracheloptyx

References 

Cheilostomatida
Bryozoan families
Extant Eocene first appearances